Tim O'Brien is an American country and bluegrass musician. In addition to his 22 solo albums and his recordings with Hot Rize, he has been featured as a performer on many albums by other artists.

Albums

Singles

As a member of Hot Rize
 1979: Hot Rize (Flying Fish)
 1981: Radio Boogie (Flying Fish)
 1986: Traditional Ties (Sugar Hill)
 1987: Untold Stories (Sugar Hill)
 1990: Take It Home (Sugar Hill)
 2002: So Long Of A Journey (Live At The Boulder Theater) (Sugar Hill)
 2014: When I'm Free (Ten In Hand)

As a member of Red Knuckles and the Trailblazers
 1982: Hot Rize Presents Red Knuckles & The Trailblazers (Flying Fish)
 1984: Honky Tonk Swing Music (Ada Production)
 1984: In Concert (Flying Fish)
 1988: Shades of the Past (Sugar Hill)

As a member of NewGrange
 1999: NewGrange (Compass)
 2005: A Christmas Heritage (Compass)

As a member of The Earls of Leicester
 2014: The Earls Of Leicester (Rounder)

As composer
 1977: Peter Wernick – Dr. Banjo Steps Out (Flying Fish) – track 6, "Gnu Breakdown" (co-written with Peter Wernick)
 1979: Mark O'Connor – Markology (Rounder) – track 3, "Kit's Waltz"
 1987: Kathy Mattea – Untasted Honey (Mercury) – track 1, "Untold Stories"; track 5, "Late in the Day"
 1996: The String Cheese Incident – Born on the Wrong Planet (SCI Fidelity) – track 3, "Land's End"
 1997: Garth Brooks – Sevens (Capitol) – track 11, "When There's No One Around" (co-written with Darrell Scott)
 1999: Phish – Hampton Comes Alive (Elektra) – track 5-02, "Nellie Kane"
 2000: Nickel Creek – Nickel Creek (Sugar Hill) – track 6, "When You Come Back Down" (co-written with Danny O'Keefe)
 2002: Dixie Chicks – Home (Monument) – track 7, "More Love" (co-written with Gary Nicholson)
 2003: Hal Ketchum – The King Of Love (Curb) – track 8, "Takin' My Time" (co-written with Hal Ketchum)
 2006: The Duhks – Migrations (Sugar Hill) – lyrics on track 7, "Moses Don't Get Lost"
 2009: The String Cheese Incident – Trick or Treat (SCI Fidelity) – track 1-01, "Land's End"
 2010: Dierks Bentley – Up on the Ridge (Capitol Nashville) – track 8, "You're Dead to Me" (co-written with Dierks Bentley and Jon Randall Stewart)
 2011: Alison Krauss and Union Station – Paper Airplane (Rounder) – track 7, "On the Outside Looking In"
 2011: Jeff White – Right Beside You (self-released) – track 10, "Climbin' Up a Mountain 2011: Gibson Brothers – Help My Brother (Compass) – track 7, "Want Vs. Need" (co-written with Eric Gibson and Leigh Gibson)
 2016: Bryan Sutton – The More I Learn (Sugar Hill) – track 1, "Walkin’ Across the Land" (co-written with Nick Forster)
 2016: Darrell Scott – Couchville Sessions (Full Light / Thirty Tigers) – track 8, "It's Another Day" (co-written with Darrell Scott)

As producer
 1990: Mollie O'Brien – Everynight in the Week (Resounding)
 1994: Open House – Second Story (Green Linnet)
 2004: Dick Siegel – A Little Pain Never Hurt (Arden)
 2006: The Duhks – Migrations (Sugar Hill) – co-producer
 2006: Riley Baugus – Long Steel Rail (Sugar Hill)
 2012: Old Man Luedecke – Tender Is The Night (True North)
 2016: John D. Hutchison – You and the World Outside (Howdy Skies)

 Other appearances 
1977 – 1993
 1977: Peter Wernick – Dr. Banjo Steps Out (Flying Fish)
 1978: Dakota Dave Hull and Sean Blackburn – North by Southwest (Biscuit City)
 1985: Carla Sciaky – In Between (Propinquity)
 1985: Peter Ostroushko with the Slüz Düz Orchestra – Slüz Düz Music: Original American Dance Tunes With an Old World Flavor (Rounder)
 1986: Laurie Lewis – Restless Rambling Heart (Flying Fish)
 1990: Dwight Yoakam – If There Was a Way (Reprise)
 1991: various artists – Sugar Plums (Holiday Treats from Sugar Hill) (Sugar Hill)
 1992: Jerry Douglas – Slide Rule (Sugar Hill)
 1993: Psychograss – Psychograss (Windham Hill)

1994 – 1999
 1994: John Gorka – Out of the Valley (High Street Records)
 1994: Mike Seeger – Third Annual Farewell Reunion (Rounder) – track 2, "Leaving Tennessee"
 1996: Kathy Kallick – Call Me a Taxi (Sugar Hill)
 1996: Phish – Red Rocks Amphitheater, Morrison, CO (8-7-1996) as special guest
 1997: Darol Anger – Heritage (Six Degrees)
 1997: Robert Earl Keen – Picnic (Arista Austin)
 1997: Ralph Stanley and Friends – Clinch Mountain Country (Rebel)
 1997: John Whelan – Celtic Crossroads (Narada Lotus)
 1998: Matt Flinner – The View from Here (Compass)
 1999: Steve Earle and the Del McCoury Band – The Mountain (E-Squared)
 1999: Béla Fleck – The Bluegrass Sessions: Tales from the Acoustic Planet, Vol. 2 (Warner Bros.)
 1999: Kate Rusby – Sleepless (Compass)
 1999: Darrell Scott – Family Tree (Sugar Hill)

2000 – 2004
 2000: Alison Brown – Fair Weather (Compass)
 2000: Steve Earle – Transcendental Blues (E-Squared)
 2001: Scott Miller and the Commonwealth – Thus Always to Tyrants (Sugar Hill)
 2001: Kate Rusby – Little Lights (Compass)
 2001: The Wayfaring Strangers – Shifting Sands of Time (Rounder)
 2002: The Chieftains – Down the Old Plank Road: The Nashville Sessions (RCA Victor)
 2002: Guy Clark – The Dark (Sugar Hill)
 2002: Karen Matheson – Time to Fall (Sanctuary / Vertical)
 2002: various artists – Christmas On The Mountain: A Bluegrass Christmas (Universal South) – track 7, "Bah Humbug"
 2003: The Chieftains – Further Down the Old Plank Road (Victor)
 2003: Steve Earle – Just an American Boy (Artemis Records)
 2003: various artists – Music from the motion picture 'Cold Mountain' (DMZ / Columbia)
 2003: various artists – The Legend Lives On: A Tribute to Bill Monroe (Audium) – track 1-08, "Highway of Sorrow"; track 2–10, "Workin' on a Building"
 2004: Mary Chapin Carpenter – Between Here and Gone (Columbia)
 2004: Maura O'Connell – Don't I Know (Sugar Hill)
 2004: various artists – Moody Bluegrass: A Nashville Tribute to The Moody Blues (Rounder)

2005 – 2009
 2005: Ciaran Tourish – Down The Line (Compass)
 2005: Joe Hodgkins – Stories (Country Roads)
 2005: Wayne Scott – This Weary Way (Full Light)
 2006: Sam Bush – Laps in Seven (Sugar Hill)
 2006: Dale Ann Bradley – Catch Tomorrow (Compass)
 2006: The Duhks – Migrations (Sugar Hill)
 2006: Chris Smither – Leave the Light On (Signature Sounds)
 2006: various artists – Sail Away: The Songs Of Randy Newman (Sugar Hill) – track 1, "Sail Away"
 2007: Karan Casey – Distant Shore (Shanachie)
 2008: Joan Baez – Day After Tomorrow (Razor & Tie)
 2008: Eric Brace and Peter Cooper – You Don't Have to Like Them Both (Red Beet)
 2009: Steve Earle – Townes (New West)
 2009: Sarah Jarosz – Song Up In Her Head (Sugar Hill)
 2000: Chris Jones and the Night Drivers – Cloud of Dust (GSM)
 2009: Steve Martin – The Crow: New Songs for the 5-String Banjo (Rounder)
 2009: Sara Watkins – Sara Watkins (Nonesuch)

2010 – present
 2010: Kris Drever – Mark the Hard Earth (Navigator)
 2010: The John Hartford Stringband – Memories of John (Compass)
 2010: Nora Jane Struthers – Nora Jane Struthers (Blue Pig)
 2011: various artists – Moody Bluegrass TWO...Much Love (Bunny Rae)
 2011: David Bromberg – Use Me (Appleseed)
 2011: Noam Pikelny – Beat the Devil and Carry a Rail (Compass)
 2011: various artists – This One's for Him: A Tribute to Guy Clark (Icehouse) – track 2-09, "Texas Cookin'" (with Darrell Scott and Gary Nicholson)
 2012: Dierks Bentley – Home (Capitol Nashville)
 2012: Mark Knopfler – Privateering (Verve Records)
 2012: Kathy Mattea – Calling Me Home (Sugar Hill)
 2012: Stan Ridgway – Mr. Trouble (A440)
 2013: Frank Solivan and Dirty Kitchen – On the Edge (Compass)
 2013: Andy Statman – Superstring Theory (Shefa)
 2014: Eric Brace and Karl Straub – Hangtown Dancehall (Red Beet)
 2014: Jack Clement – For Once and For All'" (I.R.S.)
 2014: Johnsmith – The Longing Road (self-released)
 2014: Mister Roper – Mister Roper (Red Parlor)
 2014: various artists – Link of Chain: A Songwriters' Tribute to Chris Smither (Signature Sounds) – track 9, "Origin of Species"
 2015: Sam Gleaves – Ain't We Brothers (Community Music)
 2015: Jayme Stone – Jayme Stone's Lomax Project (Borealis)
 2015: various artists – The Unbroken Circle: The Musical Heritage of The Carter Family (Dualtone)
 2016: Paul Burch – Meridian Rising (Plowboy)
 2016: The Devil Makes Three – Redemption & Ruin (New West)
 2016: John Prine – For Better, or Worse (Oh Boy)

References

External links 

Discographies of American artists
Country music discographies
Folk music discographies